Torsten Kreuger (17 June 1884 – 12 October 1973) was a Swedish engineer, industrialist, newspaper owner and banker.

Personal life
He was married three times, first to Elsa Anna Cecilia Tamm (from 1913), second to Mary Wilhelmina Nobel (from 1934), and third to Diana Blanchfleure Hedberg (from 1942).

Issue
With Diana Blanchfleure Hedberg
 6 Sten Kreuger (b. 1944)
 7 John Kreuger (b. 1945)
⚭: Estelle Ax:son Johnson (b.?) m.?- div.?; member of the Ax:son Johnson Family
⚭: Princess Irina of Romania, third daughter of King Michael I of Romania and his wife Queen Anne, m. 1983 - div. 2003
 Michael Torsten de Roumanie-Kreuger (b. 1984) ⚭ Tara Marie Littlefield
 Kohen de Roumanie-Kreuger (b. 2012)
 Angelica Margareta Bianca de Roumanie-Kreuger (b. 1986) ⚭ Richard Robert Knight (div. 2018)
 Courtney Bianca Knight (b. 2007)
 Diana Knight (b. 2011)

Career
Kreuger graduated from the Chalmers University of Technology in 1905, and undertook further studies at the KTH Royal Institute of Technology. On behalf of his father and uncle he established and developed the match factory Kalmar tändsticksfabrik, and was also involved in a factory for producing machinery for match production.

During the 1920s he became interested in acquiring ownership of newspapers. He was owner of the newspapers Stockholms Dagblad and Aftonbladet, and for a short period also Stockholms-Tidningen. In 1932 he was sentenced to prison for fraud.

References

External links
 

1884 births
1973 deaths
People from Kalmar
Chalmers University of Technology alumni
20th-century Swedish engineers
20th-century Swedish businesspeople
Swedish fraudsters
Swedish prisoners and detainees
Prisoners and detainees of Sweden
People convicted of fraud